Wishberry Online Services Pvt. Ltd. (Wishberry) is a Kickstarter-inspired crowdfunding platform based in India. It launched in 2012. The founders are Priyanka Agarwal and Anshulika Dubey.

References

Financial services companies based in Mumbai
Crowdfunding platforms of India
Internet properties established in 2011
2011 establishments in Maharashtra
Indian companies established in 2011